Invisible Creature is an illustration and graphic design studio based in Seattle, Washington. It is run by brothers Don and Ryan Clark and was formed in 2006. Don and Ryan are also the co-founders of Asterik Studio (2000-2005). Clients include: NASA, Pixar, Target, Apple, USPS, LEGO, Warby Parker, Cinerama, etc. Don is also Art Director at Canlis restaurant in Seattle.   

Invisible Creature has created CD packaging, poster art, web design, and merchandise design for artists such as Alice in Chains, Kendrick Lamar, Billy Idol, Mae, Anberlin, Pennywise, Earth Crisis, August Burns Red, Lecrae, Foo Fighters, Wolfmother, Korn, Kanye West, The Chariot, Stone Sour, Underoath and Poison the Well. The studio also has been nominated for 4 Grammy Awards for album packaging: Norma Jean's O God, the Aftermath, Fair's The Best Worst-Case Scenario.,  Hawk Nelson's Hawk Nelson Is My Friend and The Fold Secrets Keep You Sick.

References

External links
Official Website

Companies based in Seattle
Graphic design studios
American companies established in 2007